Antepione tiselaaria is a moth of the  family Geometridae. It is known from the Mexican states of Morelos and Puebla, and Costa Rica.

The length of the forewings is 17–18 mm.

External links
 A revision of the genus Antepione Packard with description of the new genus Pionenta Ferris (Lepidoptera, Geometridae, Ennominae)

Ourapterygini
Moths of Central America